The Complete First Series is the title of the debut mini-album from UK Pop rock/indie band Furthest Drive Home. It was released on 11 June 2007. Some promotional versions of the album include the extra track Better Beaching, which was cut from the final release for unknown reasons.

Track listing 
 "Diamond Watch" - 3:26
 "Director's Cut" - 3:54
 "Rationalize Not Dramatise" - 3:23
 "Forget His Facade (He's Just Playing Another Card)" - 3:37
 "Holly" - 3:00
 "Tower Over The Tallest" - 3:43
 "Better Beaching" (some promotional copies only)

Singles 
 Director's Cut
 Forget His Facade (released 13 August 2007)
 Diamond Watch (released 3 December 2007)

Success 
Forget His Facade, topped both the MTV2 Rock Chart, and the Red Button Chart in the summer of 2007.

References

2007 debut EPs